Oligopuzzled is Destroy Babylon's first album, released on July 4, 2006.

Track listing
"Rocky Shores from a Bird's Eye"
"Of Fish & Water"
"Grab a Shovel (Dig Faster!)"
"Bureaucratic Beat"
"ADD to the Album"
"Oligopuzzled (part VI)"
"Crawly Music for the Traveling Earthworm"
"No Child Left Behind"
"Machines of Nature"
"ADD to the End"

2006 debut albums
Destroy Babylon albums